Don Read (born December 15, 1933) is a former American football player, coach, and college athletics administrator.  head football coach at Portland State University   the University of Oregon  the Oregon Institute of Technology  and the University of Montana  compiling a career college football record of 

From 1968 to 1971 and 1981 to 1985, Read led the Portland State Vikings to a 39–52–1 record. From 1974 to 1976, he guided the Oregon Ducks to a  record  the two previous seasons he mentored quarterbacks and receivers under head coach 

Read's best success came at Montana, where he went , including three 11-win seasons and an NCAA Division I-AA Championship in his final year of coaching, 1995. He currently resides in Corvallis, Oregon, where he participates in scouting and game planning for Oregon State football.

Head coaching record

College

Notes

See also
 1995 NCAA Division I-AA Football Championship Game

References

1933 births
Living people
Humboldt State Lumberjacks football coaches
Montana Grizzlies and Lady Griz athletic directors
Montana Grizzlies football coaches
Oregon Ducks football coaches
Oregon Tech Hustlin' Owls football coaches
Portland State Vikings football coaches
Sacramento State Hornets football players
High school football coaches in California